Wittstock/Dosse is a town in the Ostprignitz-Ruppin district, in north-western Brandenburg, Germany.

Geography
Wittstock is situated in a terminal moraine landscape south of the Mecklenburg Lake District.

Town structure
After the incorporation of several suburban villages in December 1993 and again in October 2003, Wittstock became the 6th largest town in Germany by area. However, the former independent districts Herzsprung and Königsberg, which were forced to be integrated in 2003, regained their independence in 2004, claiming that the compulsive integration was void because of a clerical error. Both districts were still under the overview of the department of Wittstock. Since 2005, Herzsprung and Königsberg are parts of the commune Heiligengrabe, so the size of the town decreased.

The current districts of Wittstock/Dosse:

Demography

History
Wittstock resulted from a Slavic settlement and was first mentioned in the deed of formation for the Bishopric of Havelberg in 946. The name is possibly derived from vysoka ("high-lying") in the language of the local Polabian tribes, it was later Germanized into Wiztok (1271), Witzstock (1284) and Witstock (1441), adapted folk-etymologically to Low German witt ("white") and stock ("rootstock").

Obtaining the Stendal town charter on 13 September 1248 from the hands of the Havelberg Prince-bishop Henry I, it is one of the oldest towns of Brandenburg. In 1251, Wittstock received an imprint of the town seal, which was one of the oldest in Brandenburg, too. Wittstock Castle, which had been built from 1244 onwards onto a Slavic foundation, served as the residence of the Havelberg Prince-bishops from 1271; it is therefore also designated Old Bishop Castle (Alte Bischofsburg). The Havelberg era ended with the Protestant Reformation and the death of the last Catholic Prince-bishop Busso von Alvensleben at Wittstock Castle in 1548.

Up to the Thirty Years' War, the fortress was a secure stronghold—until it became the site of the 1636 Battle of Wittstock, when the troops of the Swedish Empire under Field Marshals Johan Banér and Alexander Leslie defeated the allied Imperial and Saxon forces under Elector John George I of Saxony. Followed by the outbreak of a plague epidemic two years later, Wittstock remained devastated and lost about half of its population.

The redevelopment of the town was launched by the "Great Elector" Frederick William in 1658. About 1750, numerous colonists descending from Württemberg and the Palatinate settled the region.

Politics

Seats in the town's assembly (Stadtverordnetenversammlung) as of 2019 local elections:
Christian Democratic Union: 6
Free Voters Prignitz-Ruppin: 4
The Left: 4
Social Democratic Party of Germany (SPD): 4
Farmers' association voting bloc: 2
Alliance 90/The Greens: 1
Free Democratic Party: 1

Sports
Wolfe Wittstock is a motorcycle speedway club that competes in Polish 2nd Division (3rd level of the Polish league system)

Twin town
Wittstock is twinned with:
 Höganäs in Sweden (since 2004)
 Uetersen in Germany (since 1990)

Sights

The town's main historic monument is the Brick Gothic St Mary's Church, dating back to c. 1240. Significantly enlarged as a hall church in the late 13th century and repleted with a carved altar by Claus Berg, it was used as a cathedral by the Havelberg bishops.

The Bishop's Castle was greatly restored in the 1990s and today houses a Thirty Years' War museum. The wall's height, originally , today is about 4 to 7 metres.

Personality

Freemen
 Kurt Zellmer, Superintendent: December 12, 2009 
 Wolfgang Dost, historian, in honor of his contributions to the cultural life of the city: September 24, 2011

Sons and daughters of the town
 Ellen Streidt (born 1952), sprinter, medalist at the 1976 Summer Olympics 
 Ina Muhss (born 1957), politician (SPD), since 2010 a member of the Brandenburg Landtag
 Thomas Skulski (born 1959), journalist and television presenter
 Egmont Hamelow (born 1963), local politician (CDU)

Personalities who were active in 
 Friedrich Hermann Lütkemüller (1815-1897), organ builder, lived from 1844 until his death in Wittstock

 Melli Beese (1886-1925), Germany's first female pilot, was here during First World War interned along with her husband Charles Boutard

Medal
The Medal of Honor Wittstock was awarded to:

 2010 Regina Melzer for services within the People's Solidarity and Wolfgang Wilcke for his involvement in the turnaround time

References

External links
  

Localities in Ostprignitz-Ruppin